Sharanski is a rural locality (a village) in Palkinsky District of Pskov Oblast, Russia.  As of 2002, the village did not have any recorded population.

References

Notes

Sources

Архивное управление Псковской области. Государственный архив Псковской области. "Административно-территориальное деление Псковской области (1917–2000 гг.). Справочник."  Книга 1. Изд. 2-е, переработанное и дополненное. Псков, 2002.

Rural localities in Pskov Oblast